Cypra Cecilia Krieger-Dunaij (9 April 1894 – 17 August 1974) was an Austro-Hungarian (more specifically, Galician)-born mathematician of Jewish ancestry who lived and worked in Canada.
Krieger was the third person (and first woman) to earn a Ph.D in mathematics from a university in Canada, in 1930, as well as the third woman to have been awarded a doctorate in any discipline in Canada.
Krieger is well known for having translated two works of Wacław Sierpiński in general topology.
The Krieger–Nelson Prize, awarded annually by the Canadian Mathematical Society since 1995 for outstanding research by a female mathematician, is named in honour of Krieger and Evelyn Nelson.

Early life and education 

Krieger was born on 9 April 1894 in Jasło in Galicia.
The town was then part of Austria-Hungary, but is in modern-day Poland.
Her parents, Moses and Sarah Krieger, had two sons and two daughters besides Cecilia.
Krieger began studying mathematics and physics at the University of Vienna in 1919, but moved with her family to Toronto, Ontario, Canada in 1920.
Krieger earned a B.A in 1924 and a M.A in 1925 from the University of Toronto.
She obtained her Ph.D from the same university in 1930.
Her thesis, under the supervision of W.J. Webber, was entitled
"On the summability of trigonometric series with localized parameters—on Fourier constants and convergence factors of double Fourier series".

At the University of Toronto 

While pursuing her Ph.D, Krieger was appointed as an instructor in 1928 and promoted to Lecturer in 1930 when she completed her Ph.D.
Krieger continued working at the rank of Lecturer until she was promoted to assistant professor at the University of Toronto in 1942.
She taught in both the Department of Engineering and the Department of Mathematics.
Krieger married Dr. Zygmund Dunaij in 1953.

Retirement 

Krieger continued at the rank of Assistant Professor until her retirement in 1962.
However, she continued teaching after her retirement: for five years at the University of Toronto, leaving in 1968 upon the death of her husband and for six more years at Upper Canada College, a private school in Toronto, until her own death in 1974.

Publications 

In 1934, Krieger published an English translation of Sierpinski's book Introduction to General Topology. She also translated General Topology by Sierpinski in 1952, adding a 30-page appendix on infinite cardinals and ordinals.

Recognition 

Krieger was a strong supporter of women in mathematics. In honour of the contributions of Krieger and Evelyn Nelson, the Canadian Mathematical Society created the Krieger–Nelson Prize in 1995. It is awarded to an outstanding woman in mathematics.

Notes

External links 

 Cecilia Krieger archival papers held at the University of Toronto Archives and Records Management Services

Polish mathematicians
1894 births
1974 deaths
People from Jasło
Jews from Galicia (Eastern Europe)
People from the Kingdom of Galicia and Lodomeria
Austro-Hungarian Jews
University of Toronto alumni
Canadian women mathematicians
Polish women scientists
20th-century Polish scientists
Polish women academics
20th-century Canadian women scientists
20th-century Polish women scientists
Polish emigrants to Canada